The hair disc is a receptor complex found in hairy skin.

References

Dermatology